Emmanuel Gigliotti (born 20 May 1987) is an Argentine professional footballer who plays as a striker for Nacional.

He is often known as El Puma (The Puma).

Club career

Early career
Born in Buenos Aires, Gigliotti represented Platense, Comunicaciones and Lamadrid, making his senior debut with the latter during the 2006–07 season, in Primera C Metropolitana. He contributed with 13 goals in 37 appearances as his side reached the play-offs.

In July 2007, Gigliotti joined Primera División side Argentinos Juniors after impressing in a friendly against the side. A request from Ricardo Caruso Lombardi, he was completely ostracized by new coach Néstor Gorosito and failed to make any appearances for the club.

On 25 July 2008, Gigliotti signed for All Boys of the Primera B Nacional, and finished the season as the club's top scorer and third overall.

Atlético Tucumán
On 9 August 2009, Gigliotti moved to Atlético Tucumán, newly promoted to the top tier. He made his debut for the club on 3 September, coming on as a late substitute for Juan Pablo Pereyra in a 2–0 away win against Huracán.

On 7 November 2009, in his first start, Gigliotti scored his first top tier goal by netting his team's last in a 4–2 home defeat of Tigre. Seven days later, he netted the opener in a 3–1 loss at River Plate, and finished the campaign with five goals.

Novara
On 10 July 2010, Gigliotti moved abroad for the first time in his career after joining Serie A side Novara. He made his debut for the club on 15 August 2010, replacing Marco Rigoni late into a 4–1 Coppa Italia home routing of Taranto.

Gigliotti made his debut in the first division of Italian football on 25 September 2010, replacing Cristian Bertani in a 4–1 home routing of Livorno. His first goal abroad came on 27 November, as he netted a last-minute equalizer in a 1–1 away draw against Siena.

On 18 January 2011, Gigliotti returned to his homeland, after agreeing to a six-month loan deal at former side All Boys, now in the first division. On 20 July, he moved to fellow league team San Lorenzo in a temporary one-year deal.

On 12 July 2012, Gigliotti signed a one-year loan deal with Colón, with a buyout clause. With the side, he scored a career-best 21 league goals, being the top scorer of the Torneo Final.

Boca Juniors
On 4 July 2013, after being heavily linked to Pumas UNAM, Gigliotti signed a three-year contract with Boca Juniors. He made his debut for the club on 13 August, replacing goalscorer Nicolás Blandi in a 3–2 away loss against Newell's Old Boys.

Gigliotti scored his first goal for Boca on 15 September 2013, netting the last in a 2–0 home win against Racing. Late in the month, he scored a brace in a 2–0 home defeat of Quilmes, and netted the game's only in an away success over rivals River Plate on 6 October.

On 27 November 2014, during the year's Copa Sudamericana semifinals, Gigliotti missed a penalty kick in a 1–0 loss against River Plate. After that match, he was demoted to backup option behind new signing Dani Osvaldo.

Chongqing Lifan
On 28 February 2015, Chinese Super League side Chongqing Lifan announced Gigliotti joined the club for one-year loan deal. On 24 July, after scoring nine goals, he was bought outright by US$ 3 million.

Independiente
On 20 February 2017, Gigliotti returned to his homeland and was signed by Independiente.

Deportivo Toluca
On 2 January 2019, Gigliotti was signed by Mexican Toluca.

Club León

On 18 July 2020, Gigliotti was signed by Mexican León.

Club Nacional de Football

On 15 January 2022, Gigliotti was signed by Uruguayan Nacional.

International career
Gigliotti made his full international debut for Argentina on 14 September 2011, replacing injured Mauro Boselli in a 0–0 home draw against Brazil for the 2011 Superclásico de las Américas.

Personal life
Gigliotti's younger brother Sebastián is also a footballer and a forward.

Career statistics

Club

International

Honours
Independiente
 Copa Sudamericana: 2017
 Suruga Bank Championship: 2018

León
 Liga MX: Guardianes 2020
 Leagues Cup: 2021

References

External links
 
 
 

1987 births
Living people
Footballers from Buenos Aires
Argentine people of Italian descent
Argentine footballers
Argentina international footballers
Argentine expatriate footballers
Association football forwards
General Lamadrid footballers
All Boys footballers
Argentinos Juniors footballers
Atlético Tucumán footballers
San Lorenzo de Almagro footballers
Club Atlético Colón footballers
Boca Juniors footballers
Club Atlético Independiente footballers
Novara F.C. players
Chongqing Liangjiang Athletic F.C. players
Deportivo Toluca F.C. players
Club León footballers
Club Nacional de Football players
Argentine Primera División players
Primera Nacional players
Serie B players
Chinese Super League players
Argentine expatriate sportspeople in Italy
Argentine expatriate sportspeople in China
Argentine expatriate sportspeople in Mexico
Argentine expatriate sportspeople in Uruguay
Expatriate footballers in Italy
Expatriate footballers in China
Expatriate footballers in Mexico
Expatriate footballers in Uruguay